The 2020–21 Brown Bears Men's ice hockey season would have been the 104th season of play for the program and the 60th season in the ECAC Hockey conference. The Bears represent Brown University.

Season
As a result of the ongoing COVID-19 pandemic the entire college ice hockey season was delayed. Despite the issues, Brown and most of ECAC Hockey were expecting to start playing some time in November. After the teams had assembled and began practicing, however, a sizable number of Yale's players tested positive for coronavirus. On October 16, Yale raised the campus alert status from green to yellow when the 18th member of the men's ice hockey team tested positive. Less than a month later, the Ivy League, Brown's primary conference, announced that it was cancelling all winter sports for 2020–21. Additionally the schools would not be participating in any Spring sports until the end of February. The announcement was not particularly surprising, considering that, unlike other conference, the Ivy League does not rely on revenue generated from its athletic programs.

Because the NCAA had previously announced that all winter sports athletes would retain whatever eligibility they possessed through at least the following year, none of Brown's players would lose a season of play. However, the NCAA also approved a change in its transfer regulations that would allow players to transfer and play immediately rather than having to sit out a season, as the rules previously required. Because of this, players who would have been members of Brown for the 2021 season had a pathway to leave the program and immediately play for another university.

Departures

Recruiting

† played junior hockey or equivalent during 2020–21 season.

Roster
As of September 1, 2020.

|}

Standings

Schedule and Results
Season Cancelled

References

Brown Bears men's ice hockey seasons
Brown Bears
Brown Bears
Brown Bears
Brown Bears
Brown Bears